A. darwinii may refer to:

 Abutilon darwinii, a shrub native to Brazil
 Acmella darwinii
 Alleloplasis darwinii
 Amphisbaena darwinii, the Darwin's worm lizard, a species of limbless lizard
 Arcoscalpellum darwinii
 Asteromphalus darwinii

See also
 A. darwini (disambiguation)
 Darwinii (disambiguation)